Tanki X was an arcade vehicular combat massively multiplayer online video game.

The game used the free-to-play business model, where players could download and play the game for free. However, players could also pay real-world money in the form of micro transactions to get "X Crystals". These X Crystals unlocked special cosmetic features for tanks and blueprint containers which could unlock and upgrade modules. The open beta testing started on September 15, 2016 and the full game was released on Steam on April 20, 2017. The game was shut down at the end of 2019.

Gameplay
Players control their own tank, created from a variety of turret and hull combinations, and compete against each other in a variety of maps and game modes. At the moment, Tanki X features three game modes: Deathmatch, Team Deathmatch, and Capture the Flag. Players can create their own tank combination from a selection of different turrets and hulls, all unique in their strengths and weaknesses.

In-game currency and ranking system 
For every tank destroyed or flag captured, players build up a number of XP (rank experience points) which they are rewarded, and container points. The number of experience gained is based on various factors including the number of opponents destroyed, killstreak and the amount of XP earned throughout the match. The amount of XP players gain has its own set of rewards. Players gain new ranks at particular XP milestones which publicly represent their level of skill, dedication, and time playing the game.

Players can also buy X Crystals. X Crystals are a premium currency, which is bought with real-world money and unlocks special skins, graffiti, special shell colors for turret ammo, paints for tanks and containers for module blueprints. X crystals can also be earned by completing missions and entering certain promo codes.

Ranked battles 
The ranked battle system is a ranking ladder which organizes players using RP (reputation points), which are rewarded or lost at the end of a completed battle. These points place players within a certain league, depending on how much RP they have. From lowest to highest, there are 5 leagues: Training, Bronze, Silver, Gold, and Masters. Upon entering a league for the first time, the game will grant players with the paint and 5 containers for the corresponding league. Every 2 months, the league system enters a new season. At that time, the game will award players with crystals, x crystals, and league containers for the league they ended the season in. The game also reduces each player's RP by a certain amount, depending on where they are at.

See also
Tanki Online
Official Tanki Online Website

References

External links
 

Massively multiplayer online games
Inactive massively multiplayer online games
2017 video games
Tank simulation video games
Video games developed in Russia
MacOS games
Windows games